Aurélien Nattes (born 30 March 1984) is a French semi-professional football player. Born in Laval, Mayenne, he currently plays for La Vitréenne FC.

Career
He previously played professional football in Ligue 2 for Stade Lavallois and for La Vitréenne FC in the Championnat de France amateur. He also played for Vendée Poiré sur Vie.

Notes

1984 births
Living people
French footballers
Ligue 2 players
Stade Lavallois players
Vendée Poiré-sur-Vie Football players
La Vitréenne FC players
Association football defenders